Ingazeira is a city  in the state of Pernambuco, Brazil. The population in 2020, according with IBGE was 4,543 inhabitants and the total area is 243.67 km².

Geography

 State - Pernambuco
 Region - Sertão Pernambucano
 Boundaries - São José do Egito and Tabira    (N);  Iguaraci   (S and W);  Tuparetama   (E).
 Area - 243.67 km²
 Elevation - 534 m
 Hydrography - Pajeú River
 Vegetation - Caatinga  hiperxerófila
 Climate - semi arid - (Sertão) hot
 Annual average temperature - 23.8 c
 Distance to Recife - 372.5 km

Economy

The main economic activities in Ingazeira are based in agribusiness, especially creation of sheep, goats, cattle, chickens;  and plantations of corn, beans and tomatoes.

Economic Indicators

Economy by Sector
2006

Health Indicators

References

Municipalities in Pernambuco